Duchess Amalie Louise of Courland (23 July 1687 – 18 January 1750), official titles: Herzogin in Livland, zu Kurland und Semgallen, Fürstin zu Pilten, was a duchess from the House of Kettler and through marriage Fürstin of Nassau-Siegen. She was regent of the Principality of Nassau-Siegen (part of the County of Nassau) for her stepson Frederick William II in 1722-1727.

Biography
Amalie Louise was born in Mitau on 23 July 1687 as the third daughter of Duke Frederick Casimir of Courland and his first wife Princess Sophie Amalie of Nassau-Siegen.

Frederick William Adolf was the widower of Landgravine Elisabeth Juliana Francisca of Hesse-Homburg. Amalie Louise was not only a first cousin of her husband Frederick William Adolf, but also of his first wife Elisabeth Juliana Francisca.

On the death of his father in 1691, Frederick William Adolf succeeded his father as the territorial lord of the Protestant part of the principality of Nassau-Siegen and co-ruler of the city of Siegen. He possessed the district of Siegen (with the exception of seven villages) and the districts of Hilchenbach and Freudenberg. He shared the city of Siegen with the Catholic Fürst of Nassau-Siegen. Following the death of Frederick William Adolf in 1722 he was succeeded by Frederick William II, the only son from the first marriage. But because the latter was still a minor, he was under the guardianship and regency of his stepmother Amalie Louise until 1727.

After her regency, Amalie Louise continued to live in the Nassauischer Hof, which has been called Untere Schloss since the mid-18th century. The northern wing of the palace is still called the Kurländer Flügel after her.

Amalie Louise’ stepson Frederick William II died in the Nassauischer Hof in Siegen on 2 March 1734, he was only 27 years old. On 19 June, his widow Sophie Polyxena Concordia of Sayn-Wittgenstein-Hohenstein gave birth to the fifth daughter. Thus, there were no male heirs and the Dowager Fürstin was compelled to accept that the Catholic Fürst William Hyacinth would take possession of the Reformed lands and the city of Siegen. However, the Fürsten Christian of Nassau-Dillenburg and William Charles Henry Friso of Nassau-Diez also laid claim to the inheritance. Their soldiers occupied the Nassauischer Hof in Siegen, while William Hyacinth was in Spain. In order to drive out this occupation by Nassau-Dillenburg and Nassau-Diez, Elector Clemens August of Cologne called in the Landesausschuß in his countries bordering the Siegerland. On 20 August 1735, peasants from Cologne crossed the borders of the Principality of Nassau-Siegen and plundered ‘was ihnen vorkam’. On 23 August they were admitted to the (Catholic) castle and advanced with two to three thousand men to the (Reformed) Nassauischer Hof. But the armies of Nassau-Dillenburg and Nassau-Diez, united with the citizens of Siegen, forced the troops from Cologne to flee. Thus, the Reformed part of Siegerland remained under the rule of Nassau-Dillenburg and Nassau-Diez, and the Catholic part remained under the imperial administration.

During the visits to his German lands in 1741 and 1742, Prince William IV of Orange-Nassau stayed with Amalie Louise and her daughter-in-law Sophie Polyxena Concordia in the Nassauischer Hof in Siegen.

She was buried on 23 March 1750 in the  there.

Issue
From the marriage of Amalie Louise and Frederick William Adolf the following children were born:
 Sophia Wilhelmine Adolphina (Nassauischer Hof, Siegen, 28 February 1709 – Nassauischer Hof, Siegen, 16 December 1710).
 Charles Frederick (Nassauischer Hof, Siegen, 4 March 1710 – Nassauischer Hof, Siegen, 25 December 1710).
 Wilhelmine Charlotte Louise (Nassauischer Hof, Siegen, 25 April 1711 – Untere Schloss, Siegen, 7 March 1771).
 Augusta Amelie (Siegen, 9 September 1712 – Wittgenstein Castle, Laasphe, 22 February 1742), married in Siegen on 6 May 1738 to Count Frederick of Sayn-Wittgenstein-Hohenstein (Berlin, 29 January 1708 – 9 June 1756). He later remarried the youngest sister of Augusta Amelie.
 Louis Ferdinand (Nassauischer Hof, Siegen, 29 March 1714 – Nassauischer Hof, Siegen, 26 February 1715).
 Caroline Amelie Adolphina (Siegen, 26 November 1715 – Laubach, 10 August 1752), married at Wittgenstein Castle in Laasphe on 11 February 1751 to Count Christian August of Solms-Laubach (Wetzlar, 1 August 1714 – Laubach, 20 February 1784).
 William Maurice (Nassauischer Hof, Siegen, 1 March 1717 – Nassauischer Hof, Siegen, 5 August 1719).
 Elizabeth Hedwig (Siegen, 19 April 1719 – Wittgenstein Castle, Laasphe, 10 January 1789), married in Siegen on 12 June 1743 to Count Frederick of Sayn-Wittgenstein-Hohenstein (Berlin, 29 January 1708 – 9 June 1756). He was the widower of an older sister of Elisabeth Hedwig.

Ancestors

Notes

References

Sources
 
 
 
 
 
 
 
 
 
 
 
 
 
 
  (2004). "Die Fürstengruft zu Siegen und die darin von 1669 bis 1781 erfolgten Beisetzungen". In:  u.a. (Redaktion), Siegener Beiträge. Jahrbuch für regionale Geschichte (in German). Vol. 9. Siegen: Geschichtswerkstatt Siegen – Arbeitskreis für Regionalgeschichte e.V. p. 183–202.
 
 
  (1882). Het vorstenhuis Oranje-Nassau. Van de vroegste tijden tot heden (in Dutch). Leiden: A.W. Sijthoff/Utrecht: J.L. Beijers.

External links

 Baltic States. In: Medieval Lands. A prosopography of medieval European noble and royal families, compiled by Charles Cawley.
 Nassau. In: Medieval Lands. A prosopography of medieval European noble and royal families, compiled by Charles Cawley.
 Nassau Part 5. In: An Online Gotha, by Paul Theroff.

|-

Courland, Amalie Louise
Courland, Amalie Louise
Courland, Amalie Louise
Courland, Amalie Louise
Courland, Amalie Louise
∞
Princesses of Nassau
People from Jelgava
Courland, Amalie Louise
Courland, Amalie Louise
Courland, Amalie Louise
Courland, Amalie Louise
18th-century women rulers